Oberkampf were a French punk rock band formed in 1978 by Pat Kebra (guitar), Joe Hell (vocals), Buck-Dali (bass) and Dominik Descoubes (drums).

Discography

Albums
 P.L.C - 1983
 Cris sans thème - 1985

Singles
 Couleurs sur Paris - 1981
 Fais attention - 1985
 Maximum - 1983
 La Marseillaise - 1983
 Linda - 1983

References

External links
Official site (French language)

French punk rock groups
Musical groups from Paris